Homalopoma rotundatum is a species of sea snail, a marine gastropod mollusc in the family Colloniidae.

Description
The size of the shell varies between 2 mm and 3.6 mm.

Distribution
This marine species is found off the Cape Province, South Africa.

References

 Kilburn, R.N. & Rippey, E. (1982) Sea Shells of Southern Africa. Macmillan South Africa, Johannesburg, xi + 249 pp. page(s): 48

External links
 

Colloniidae
Gastropods described in 1889